Alfonso Graniero Avalos (died 1585) was a Roman Catholic prelate who served as Bishop of La Plata o Charcas (1579–1585).

Biography
On 9 January 1579, Alfonso Graniero Avalos was appointed during the papacy of Pope Gregory XIII as Bishop of La Plata o Charcas.
In 1579, he was consecrated bishop by Pedro de Moya y Contreras, Archbishop of México, with Juan de Medina Rincón y de la Vega, Bishop of Michoacán, and Diego de Romano y Govea, Bishop of Tlaxcala, serving as co-consecrators. 
He served as Bishop of La Plata o Charcas until his death in 1585.

References

External links and additional sources
 (for Chronology of Bishops) 
 (for Chronology of Bishops) 

16th-century Roman Catholic bishops in Bolivia
Bishops appointed by Pope Gregory XIII
1585 deaths
Roman Catholic bishops of Sucre